is a Japanese professional footballer who plays as a defensive midfielder for  club Kashima Antlers.

Career statistics

Club
.

References

External links

2002 births
Living people
Association football people from Ibaraki Prefecture
Japanese footballers
Association football midfielders
J1 League players
Kashima Antlers players